Lifeline project was a drug and alcohol abuse charity based in Manchester.

It was established in 1971 by Eugenie Cheesmond and Rowdy Yates, and with support from the Bishop of Manchester and the 8th Day Collective. Cheesmond had crossed swords with the Board at Parkside Hospital in Macclesfield about rehabilitation for drug users when she was their Registrar Psychiatrist. Yates, was an ex-addict and had been helped by Cheesmond. Lifeline began to run services across Yorkshire, the North East, the North West, London and the Midlands. 

The charity supported 900 people in York with a team of 50 staff made up of recovery workers, criminal justice workers, young people's workers, nurses, doctors and volunteers. They were involved in Thames Valley Police’s initiative for Alcohol Harm Reduction Week in Oxford, aiming to keep students who have left home for the first time safe from alcohol-related crime.

Lifeline was involved in a safe haven for drunks and vulnerable people in Middlesbrough which was designed to relieve pressure on the casualty department at James Cook University Hospital freeing up A&E professionals to deal with genuine emergencies.

In December 2014 Manchester Mental Health and Social Care Trust won a contract to lead the running of health services at both Strangeways prison and HM Prison Buckley Hall in Rochdale.  They worked with Lifeline to deliver services aimed at reducing drug and alcohol problems among prisoners.

Paul Flowers was chair of the organisation until 2014 when he was asked to resign over allegedly excessive expenses claims. On 19 May 2017, the charity collapsed, just after the Charity Commission for England and Wales launched an investigation into its financial controls. At that time it employed almost 1,500 people. CGL were expected to take over some of their staff and projects.

References

External links
 Lifeline project

Charities based in England
Addiction organisations in the United Kingdom